Billy Davis Jr. (born June 26, 1938) is an American singer and musician, best known as a member of the 5th Dimension. Along with his wife Marilyn McCoo, he had hit records during 1976 and 1977 with "I Hope We Get to Love in Time", "Your Love", and "You Don't Have to Be a Star (To Be in My Show)". Davis and McCoo were married in 1969. They became the first African-American married couple to host a network television series, titled The Marilyn McCoo & Billy Davis Jr. Show, on CBS in the summer of 1977, the year "You Don't Have to Be a Star (To Be in My Show)" won a Grammy Award.

Early life
Billy Davis Jr. was born in St. Louis, Missouri.

Career
Davis joined The 5th Dimension, then called The Versatiles, in 1966. The group's first big hit was with 1967's "Up, Up and Away", written by Jimmy Webb. The song won four 1968 Grammy Awards and was the title track to the 5th Dimension's first hit LP. A year later, the group recorded the song  "Stoned Soul Picnic". A medley of "Aquarius/Let the Sunshine In" (from the musical Hair) reached No. 1 on the US Billboard Hot 100 chart in April to May 1969 and won the Grammy Award for Record of the Year. The group's recording of "Wedding Bell Blues" topped the US Hot 100 in November 1969. Davis sang the male lead on the group's singles "Worst That Could Happen", "A Change Is Gonna Come/People Got to Be Free", and "I'll Be Lovin' You Forever".

In 1975, Davis and McCoo left the 5th Dimension and began to perform as a duo. Landing a contract with ABC Records, they recorded their 1976 debut album I Hope We Get to Love in Time. The first single was the title track, which was a moderate hit. The follow-up "You Don't Have to Be a Star (To Be in My Show)" was an even bigger hit, reaching No. 1 on the US Billboard Hot 100 in January 1977. Davis and McCoo were awarded a gold single and a gold album as well as a Grammy Award for Best R&B Performance by a Duo or Group with Vocals. They released one more album on ABC in 1978, produced by Frank Wilson and containing the ballad "My Reason to Be". The pair signed with CBS Records the following year and released their last album as a duo until October 2008 when they released The Many Faces of Love, a collection of hit songs from the 1960s and 1970s.

The album Marilyn and Billy featured the song "Saving All My Love for You", later turned into a number one hit by Whitney Houston. It also contained the disco single "Shine On Silver Moon". The pair decided to go solo professionally in the early 1980s.

In 1982, Davis recorded the gospel album Let Me Have a Dream with Rev. James Cleveland. Davis followed that project with a guest appearance on a jazz/pop album by Scott Scheer.

In 2020, Davis and McCoo released a new album called Blackbird Lennon-McCartney Icons for first time in 30 years. Entrepreneur Kathy Ireland released the album through her record label EE1. The duo said it was a civil rights movement which became a human rights movement with a goal to encourage people to come together during trying times. During an interview about the album on June 29, 2021, Questlove called McCoo and Davis "the first couple of Pop and Soul." They would later appear in Quest's directorial debut, Summer of Soul.

Theater, television, and film
Davis and McCoo were featured in an episode of the TV variety show, Captain and Tennille, in the 1970s.

Davis starred in the musical Blues in the Night at the Old Globe Theatre. In the role of James "Thunder" Early, he also starred in the North Carolina Theatre production of Dreamgirls. Kay McLain, of the Durham Herald-Sun, wrote "Davis made an endearing character of Early…give him a microphone and the spotlight and he's a pro." 

In his later guest appearances on the WB's Jamie Foxx Show, he and McCoo played the affluent parents of Foxx's girlfriend Fancy. Over the years, Davis has made frequent appearances on national morning and night time talk and variety shows. Davis also appeared alongside McCoo in the 2021 documentary Summer of Soul where they reflected on their participation and impact of the 1969 Harlem Cultural Festival.

References

External links

 
 Marilyn McCoo & Billy Davis Jr. (official website)
 

1938 births
Living people
Grammy Award winners
Musicians from St. Louis
Singers from Missouri
21st-century African-American male singers
20th-century African-American male singers